Wester Hailes Baptist Church is a church in the Wester Hailes area of west Edinburgh, Scotland, founded in 1971.

External links
 Official website

Churches in Edinburgh
Christian organizations established in 1971
Baptist churches in Scotland